Pastovce is a village and municipality in the Levice District in the Nitra Region of Slovakia.

History
In historical records the village was first mentioned in 1135.

Geography
The village lies at an altitude of 124 metres and covers an area of 12.859 km². It has a population of about 540 people.

Ethnicity
The village is approximately 74% Magyar, 24% Slovak and 2% Czech.

Facilities
The village has a public library, swimming pool and football pitch.

External links

Official website
https://web.archive.org/web/20071027094149/http://www.statistics.sk/mosmis/eng/run.html

Villages and municipalities in Levice District
Hungarian communities in Slovakia